was a Japanese artist in the middle period of the Edo era. He was the 18th head of the Tosa school. Painters that belonged to the Tosa were good at painting in the Yamato-e style. Successive heads of the Tosa served the Emperors as edokoro-azukari (Official court painter). His father was Tosa Mitsunari. In 1696, he succeeded his father's occupation and became an official court painter. In 1709, he did paintings of room partitions in the royal palace and in the Sento palace with Kano Tsunenobu. He died in 1710 at the age of 36.

References
 Fréderic, Louis (2002). Japan Encyclopedia, Cambridge: Mass.: Belknap Press of Harvard University Press.

External links
 Web shop for Japanese hanging scroll paintings
 Rare Antiques Tanigushi
 Museum of Far Eastern Antiquities, Stockholm: Painting, Bekesy-023

People of Edo-period Japan
Japanese painters